Steve Walters (born 1965) is an Australian rugby league player.

Steve or Steven Walters may also refer to:

Steve Walters (footballer) (born 1972), English footballer
Steve Walters (rugby league played 1988) (born 1967), Australian rugby league player associated with Newcastle Knights

See also
 Stephen Walters (born 1975), English actor